The Beach 60th Street station (signed as Beach 60th Street–Straiton Avenue station) is a station on the IND Rockaway Line of the New York City Subway. Located in Queens on the Rockaway Freeway at Beach 60th Street, it is served by the A train at all times. The station opened in 1892, and was rebuilt in 1942 as an elevated station.

History 

Beach 60th Street–Straiton Avenue was originally built by the Long Island Rail Road along the Rockaway Beach Branch as Straiton Avenue, also known as Arverne–Straiton Avenue in 1892 as part of a quarrel between the LIRR and  New York lawyer and developer Remington Vernam over the original Arverne Station on Gaston Avenue. It also served as a trolley stop of the Ocean Electric Railway. 

The station was rebuilt as an elevated station on April 10, 1942. After being purchased by the New York City Transit Authority on October 3, 1955, it reopened as a subway station on June 28, 1956.

The station was renovated in 2010.

Station layout

This elevated station has two tracks and two side platforms.

Exits
The full-time entrance to the station is at the west end and has two stairs to the northeast corner of Rockaway Freeway and Beach 59th Street. The station house under the platform has a turnstile bank, token booth and two staircase to each platform. There is an additional exit-only staircase at the west end of the eastbound platform.

References

External links 
 
 
 The Subway Nut — Beach 60th Street – Straiton Avenue Pictures 
 Beach 59th Street entrance from Google Maps Street View
 Platforms from Google Maps Street View

IND Rockaway Line stations
New York City Subway stations in Queens, New York
Railway stations in the United States opened in 1956
Rockaway, Queens
1956 establishments in New York City